Chhota Bheem is an Indian animated comedy adventure television series, created by Green Gold Animations based in Hyderabad. This show is available in English, Hindi, Telugu and Tamil. Bheem is a brave, strong and intelligent young boy. He often manages to solve everyone's problems which endears him to the townspeople of Dholakpur.

Plot
The series is set in a village in the fictional kingdom of Dholakpur. The series revolves around Bheem, sometimes referred to as Chhota Bheem due to his young age, a boy who is strong and intelligent.

Bheem is a well loved figure in the village known for his good heart and helping hand. His closest friends are Chutki, a clever girl, Raju, a brave toddler wearing nothing but his underpants, and a talking monkey called Jaggu. 

The show revolves around Bheem and his team using their skills to solve various problems affecting the village, unravel mysteries, fight evils that seek to harm Dholakpur or its inhabitants, or foil the plans of their rivals Kalia, Dholu and Bholu, who aim to embarrass Bheem. Their antics also sometimes get them into trouble.

Supernatural events have often been used in some episodes, like Dholakpur being attacked by the demon Zimbara, the evil witch, or the rival kingdom of Botakpur. Bheem and his team participating in various competitions in Dholakpur or in adjoining kingdoms are also a common theme, as is the celebration of Indian festivities and the protection of nature.

Characters

Main 
Chhota Bheem: Bheem  is main protagonist of the show. He is an adventurous, fun-loving but virtuous boy who is gifted with  superhuman strength. This strength can be powered up by consuming laddoos, his favourite food. Bheem appears bare chested, wearing an orange dhoti and a gold pendant. He has brown hair. 

His power is a boon for his village, Dholakpur, which is constantly beset by all kinds of problems. Bheem is beloved and respected by the village for being l kind and using his strength to help those who are poor, wronged, or needy, and may be considered a little guardian of the villagers and the animals in and around Dholakpur. Bheem is often seen defeating enemies who attack Dholakpur or harm the villagers, like the evil demon Kirmada, the robber Mangal Singh, and the evil witch. Having gained the king Raja Indraverma's trust, Bheem discusses the village issues with the ministers of the kingdom. Being intelligent and strong he represents Dholakpur in various matters and competitions.

Chutki: Chutki is a young girl and the daughter of Tuntun Mausi, the sweet-maker. She often helps Bheem sneak laddoos from her mothers shop. Chutki is the brains of the team. She wears a purple floral lehenga and has her brown hair in twin braids. Her name means young or little one.

Chutki is Bheem's closest friend and he often relies on her to solve any puzzles or difficult situations with her intelligence. She  first met Bheem, Raju and Jaggu when Bheem had saved her from a raging bull. While she is responsible for her household chores and gentle towards all people and other creatures, she can be tough when the situation demands it. 

In many episodes and in the film 'Chhota Bheem: Master of Shaolin': The Movie, she is depicted as being good at martial arts. Chutki frequently supplies Bheem with laddoos on missions to boost his strength.

Raju: Raju is a daring, and mischievous boy, whose role model is Bheem. He is a bald headed toddler who wears nothing but his blue underpants. 

Raju's size belies his courage, which he gets from his father, commander of the King's army. Raju also wants to be the commander of the Army. He is a prodigy at archery and has won the "Arjuna Cup". Raju is also very articulate and intelligent for his age, being able to converse and follow along with his older friends on their adventures with no difficulty.

Raju is a diminutive form of Raja and means “king”.

Jaggu: Jaggu is a blue, talking monkey. Jaggu has his own special way of solving problems, using tricks accompanied by his sense of humour. Bheem learns useful techniques like swinging from trees from him. Whenever they are really hungry, Jaggu assists him in stealing laddus. He also loves playing tricks on Kalia, Dholu and Bholu.

Kalia: Kalia is an envious bully. He is depicted as a ambitious boy who is always outshone by Bheem. He has two fearful lackeys, Dholu and Bholu, twin brothers who sometimes help him with his plans and, at other times, quickly abandon him. He often blows his own trumpet by claiming he is the strongest and most courageous person. Whenever any problem arises, he runs away. Despite his competitive personality, he also helps the gang out for important matters, such as an attack on Dholakpur. He is depicted as a tall and overweight boy wearing only a short tied up grey dhoti and lots of gold jewellery.

Kalia is a nickname that means “dark one” or “tan skinned”. 

Dholu and Bholu: Dholu and Bholu are identical twins and followers of Kalia. Though they are not strong themselves, they bask in Kalia's strength. Despite their support for a bully, they have kind hearts and have also won a trophy for their close brotherhood. But sometimes, they argue among themselves and get scolded by Kalia. They are differentiated by their clothing, each twin wear a similar set of olive green and brown turban, t-shirt and pants with opposite colouring.

Dholu means “drummer” and Bholu means “innocent”.

Recurring 
Indumati: Indumati is the Princess of Dholakpur and daughter of Indraverma and elder sister of Ravi Varma. She is kindhearted 7-year-old girl. She is also a friend of Bheem, Chutki, Raju, Jaggu, Kalia, Dholu and Bholu. She has blue eyes, reddish brown hair, and wears a blue and gold lehenga with an orange flower adorning her hair. While she seldom joins the gang on missions, she is a trusted friend and supports them. 

Indraverma: The King of Dholakpur and the father of Indumati and Ravi Varma. He lives in a palace on top of a hill overlooking Dholakpur. He mostly relies on Bheem for any crisis in the kingdom and trusts the boy greatly.

Kichak: Kichak is a teen wrestler from Pehelwanpur. Like Kalia, Kichak is also jealous of Bheem, since Bheem is more popular than him. But he is defeated on all occasions. Kichak's jealousy towards Bheem is a bit more severe than Kalia's.

Chhota Manu: He is also a character from Pehelwanpur. Chhota  Manu is physically strong and clever. He is rival of Raju, whom he never managed to defeat. He is a sidekick as well as a friend of Kichak, making various plans to defeat Bheem.

Daku Mangal Singh: Mangal Singh is a bandit who used to terrorize Dholakpur when he was free. But he was arrested by Bheem. He often comes to rob Dholakpur.

Dhooni Baba: Dhooni Baba is a sage who lives in a cave. In the former episodes, he was called "Baba Bol Bachchan" and has a body smeared with ash and seen meditating on some needles. Indeed, Dhoni means “incense”. Later, his body has no ash smeared and he walks with a walking stick. He is described as a sage who knows almost everything and has divine powers. He gives advice and also a solution to Bheem and his friends.

Tuntun: Tuntun, or Tuntun aunt, She is Chutki's mother. She owns a sweet shop where she sells her famous homemade laddoos. Bheem often aggravates her by stealing laddoos, but she is also kind-hearted like Chutki. Sometimes she gives Bheem laddoos to make him stronger and help him defeat his enemies.

Bheem's Family
Bheem has a family of five members:
 Mother: Bheem's unnamed mother lives with him in their home. She is shown as a cameo in many episodes and some movies.
 Grandfather- Bheem's grandfather is also a fighter like Bheem. Bheem resembles his grandfather in the fighting. His grandfather owns a magical trunk having magical items in it. He also likes laddoos.
 Father: He was shown in the episode ‘’Diwali Dhamaka’’ and was responsible for bringing the two-headed demon in Dholakpur. But also gives an idea to Bheem regarding Demon's death. But in the movie Bheem in the city, Bheem’s father, whose name is Abhimanyu, works in Raunak Sheher.
 Grandmother: His grandmother is never shown in the series but was shown in an advertisement.

Professor Shastri Dhoomketoo: He is an inventor who lives In Gyanpur (“village of knowledge”). He often ends up getting problems with his inventions, like getting his inventions stolen, or malfunctioning. His inventions include a time machine, a hot air balloon, a super-fast bicycle, etc.

Shivani: Bheem's foster sister is Shivani. She lives in Pehelwanpur and runs a dhaba there named "Shivani ka Dhaba". Her father is falsely imprisoned by the cruel king, and to free him she needs 500 gold coins. But the pehalwan (wrestler) Dabbu tries to take over the Dhaba. Bheem comes to her rescue and even frees her father from jail. Their close relationship is demonstrated in an episode where she sent Bheem a letter on Raksha Bandhan, not writing much, leading Bheem to think something was suspicious and going to see her. After he solved her problems she tied a rakhi on his wrist. 

Buri Jadugarni: Buri Jadugarni is an evil sorceress who is an enemy of Bheem. She tried to become the queen of Dholakpur but never succeeded because of Bheem and his team. She is also called Buri Pari or Buri Chudail.

 Acchi Jadugarni: She is a good Sorceress who helps Bheem in defeating Buri Jadugarni. She is also called Achhi Pari.
She lives in Agadam, a place of good wizards and witches or in the forest of Dholakpur.

Avi Chacha: He is another scientist who lives in Dholakpur.  He is also a friend of Professor Shastri Dhoomketu. He invented many gadgets but all were destroyed.

Kaptaan Singh: He is the head captain of a ship of Dholakpur, Dholakpur Queen.

Raaka: He is the sidekick of Daku Mangal Singh.

Daku Chacha: He is an experienced dacoit uncle of Daku Mangal Singh.

Kirmada: He is a demon who tries to attack Dholakpur. He has appeared in the Chhota Bheem and Krishna film series and also in few of Super Bheem film series.

Kallasura and Chalchaaya: They are the sons or successors of Kirmada.

Guest
Ganesh: Ganesh was shown in the movie Chhota Bheem and Ganesh in the Amazing Odyssey and was also shown in some episodes and other films.

Krishna: Krishna is a character who occurs in a few episodes and in the movies Chhota Bheem Aur Krishna, Chhota Bheem Aur Krishna Vs Zimbara, Chhota Bheem Aur Kaalsura Ka Jadui Jaal, Chhota Bheem and Krishna in the Rise of Kirmada and Chhota Bheem and Krishna in the Patliputra City of Dead and Dwarka - The lost City  and "Chhota Bheem and Krishna in Mayanagri ".  He also appears in one of the top recent films of Chhota Bheem released in October 2021 named Chhota Bheem Ki Citti Pitti Gul.

Hanuman: Hanuman was also shown in this show in a movie Chhota Bheem Aur Hanuman.

Zimbara and Mayandri: They are the siblings of Kirmada.

Production

Development
Rajiv Chilaka wanted to create his own intellectual property instead of working for other companies. He established his animation studio Green Gold Animation in 2001. He had to struggle as no TV channel was ready to pick up the Indian animation content and most Indian contents aired were mythological in nature. His company produced Vikram Betal and Krishna animation shows which convinced Pogo TV to give chance. After five years of conception, Chhota Bheem made his first appearance in 2008 on Pogo TV. It succeeded and continued to run. He is financed by Samir Jain, who belongs to the famous Jain-cum-Agarwal business family from Meerut. Raj Viswanadha, who did the writing for the first four years of Bheem before leaving the series, Arun Shendurnikar, Nidhi Anand are prominent among those who have written the stories for the show.

Influences
Rajiv Chilaka had conceived an adventurous young boy with the strength and attributes of Bhima from Mahabharata, living in an unspecified period in medieval India. He was also influenced by his childhood spent with Disney's animated shows, Tintin, Amar Chitra Katha and other superhero comics.

Broadcast
It is aired on Pogo TV in India. As of August 2011, more than 200 episodes, 5 movies have been released and aired.

In April 2020 DD National acquired the syndication rights of the series from 17 April 2020 to 3 May 2020 when the production of the ongoing series had to be stopped by the channel due to COVID-19 pandemic.
But on 24 August 2020 it once again aired on Pogo TV in India with 39 new episodes with 4 new movies and ever since then it is on broadcast until today.

Reception
The show became successful among younger children. It is considered as India's largest children's entertainment brand. The show has a viewership of  60 million viewers in India and beyond and now 60 million plus subscribers on YouTube. It has become more appealing to broader audience as it is coming up with something new each day with rotating episodes and new movies with fun, excitement and enthusiasm.

Movies 
Chhota Bheem Aur Krishna
Chhota Bheem Aur Krishna in Pataliputra
Chhota Bheem & Krishna: Mayanagari
Chhota Bheem: Journey to Petra
Chhota Bheem Master of Shaolin
Chhota Bheem and the Curse of Damyaan
Chhota Bheem and Ganesh in the Amazing Odyssey
Chhota Bheem: Dholakpur to Kathmandu
Chhota Bheem Aur Hanuman
Chhota Bheem and The Rise of Kirmada
Chhota Bheem and the Throne of Bali
Chhota Bheem aur Krishna vs Zimbara
Chhota Bheem and The Shinobi Secret
Chhota Bheem and the Incan Adventure
Chhota Bheem And The Broken Amulet
Chhota Bheem Neeli Pahadi
Chhota Bheem Ki Baazi
Chhota Bheem aur Paanch Ajoobe
Chhota Bheem Aur Chhalchhaaya
Chhota Bheem: Mayavi Gorgan
Chhota Bheem Banjara Masti
Chhota Bheem: Dinosaur World
Chhota Bheem and Sky Dragon
Chhota Bheem: Mission Mangalayan
Chhota Bheem in African Safari
Chhota Bheem Himalayan Adventure
Chhota Bheem Singapura Ka Rahasya
Chhota Bheem Ka Troll Se Takkar
Chhota Bheem Aur Kaala Yodha
Chhota Bheem Ka Romani Adventure
Bheemayan
Chhota Bheem Dus pe Dus
Chhota Bheem The Crown Of Valhalla
Chhota Bheem Kung Fu Dhamaka
Bheem vs Aliens
Chhota Bheem Aur Nawadir ke Shehzaade
Chhota Bheem Ka Roosi Romanch
Chhota Bheem and the Rise Of Damyaan
Chhota Bheem aur Kaalsura ka Jaduii Jall
 Chhota Bheem aur Arazim Ka Raaz
Bheem Ban Gaya Super Star
Bheem In The City
Chhota Bheem Aur Malongh Ka Raaz
Chhota Bheem Ki Citti Pitti Gul
Chhota Bheem Aur Chand Pari Ki Dastan
Veer Bahadur Bheem
Chhota Bheem And The Legend of El Magnifico
Chhota Bheem Aur Mahavinashini Ka Vinash

See also
 List of Indian animated television series

References

For an update, Chhota Bheem and others are an Indian film actors and actresses who are from Dholakpur, from Hyderabad. They all speak Hindi, Telugu and English. 
Look in this site: http://www.woodsdeck.com/movies/14890-chhota-bheem-himalayan-adventure-2016

 
2008 Indian television series debuts
2000s animated television series
Comedy-drama television series
Indian children's animated action television series
Indian children's animated adventure television series
Indian children's animated comedy television series
Pogo (TV channel) original programming
2010s Indian television series
Television series based on Mahabharata
Television shows adapted into comics
Television shows adapted into films
Television shows adapted into video games